Following Ross Perot's impressive showing during the 1996 presidential election, the Reform Party of the United States of America became the country's largest third party. The party's 2000 presidential candidate would be entitled to $12.5 million in matching funds. Several high-profile candidates vied for the nomination, including Donald Trump, Pat Buchanan, and physicist John Hagelin. For a brief time, Congressman John B. Anderson and Congressman Ron Paul were considered potential candidates, but both ultimately declined to seek the nomination.

The party's 2000 candidates received a great deal of media attention, particularly after a dispute at the party's national convention in Long Beach, California led to a schism and the formation of a rebel faction. Supporters of physicist John Hagelin refused to accept Pat Buchanan as the party's chairman, and staged a walk-out, which was broadcast live on television.

Ultimately, a court decided Buchanan was the party's nominee, however, the drama surrounding the convention is often credited with leading to the downfall of the Reform Party.

The campaign

Buchanan enters race

During the 1992 Republican Presidential Primaries, commentator Pat Buchanan fared extremely well and received 22.96% of the total vote. During his 1996 bid, Buchanan spent a brief time as the Republican front-runner; his campaign carried four states, including New Hampshire, Alaska, Missouri, and Louisiana. Buchanan re-entered the presidential race in 2000, hoping to be the primary "Stop Bush" candidate. He was, however, viewed much less favorably by his fellow Republicans, and he struggled to place fifth during an Iowa Straw Poll.

Reform Party member William von Raab launched a "Draft Buchanan" movement, and in October 1999 Buchanan announced his departure from the Republican Party, disparaging them (along with the Democrats) as a "beltway party." He announced that he would seek the presidential nomination of the Reform Party, and immediately sought to align himself with the "Russ Verney faction" of the party. Some in the Reform Party voiced concerns that Buchanan, ardently pro-life and anti-gay rights, would inadvertently move the party too far to the right. During a meeting with Reform Party leadership at Pat Choate's Washington, D.C. home, Buchanan assured the party elite that his campaign would not address social issues, instead focusing on economic policy.

At the time Buchanan entered the race, the Reform Party was engulfed in a feud between the supporters of Ross Perot and newly elected Minnesota Governor Jesse Ventura, who, as the Reform Party's highest elected official, was rumored to be considering a presidential bid on the party ticket in 2004. Buchanan's campaign immediately aligned itself with diverse factions within the party, including Russ Verney and Marxist Lenora Fulani.

On November 12, 1999 Fulani formally endorsed Buchanan, saying: "We are going to integrate that peasant army of his.  We are going to bring black folks, Latino folks, gay folks and liberal folks into that army...I'm going to take Pat Buchanan to 125th Street in Harlem.  We are going to have lunch at Sylvia's.  I am going to take him to speak at Reverend Sharpton's National Action Network." Fulani became Buchanan's campaign co-chair.

At the same time, the Buchanan campaign began to gain support among white nationalists. He gained the endorsement of former Ku Klux Klan leader David Duke, who quit the Republican Party and joined the Reform Party to assist Buchanan's campaign. Almost all white nationalists left the Reform Party following the campaign; in 2004 the party nominated Lebanese-American Ralph Nader as its presidential candidate.

Trump enters race
Supporters of the Jesse Ventura faction began encouraging Donald Trump to enter the race, likely as a placeholder for Ventura, who said he would not consider a presidential bid until after his term as governor ended. On October 25, 1999, Trump joined the Reform Party. and for a brief time he seemed to be a credible alternative to Buchanan. His pre-campaign gained a great deal of media attention. It seemed as though the primaries would amount to a showdown between Buchanan and Trump, the latter of whom remained confident he could win not only the primary, but also the general election. Trump told reporters: "It's not so much the Reform Party, it's really the fact that I'd want to make that if I ran and spent a lot of money I could actually win, I could beat that Democrat-Republican apparatus."

On October 19, 1999, Donald Trump announced he would file to appear on the California primary ballot. During the California primary, he received 15,311 votes or 37% of the Reform votes cast, giving him the lead in a five-person field. His total was 0.3% of the entire California primary vote. Trump ultimately withdrew his candidacy. During an appearance on The Today Show, he stated: "The Reform Party is a total mess! You have Buchanan, a right winger, and you have Fulani, a Communist, and they have merged.... I don't know what you have!"

Schism

Physicist John Hagelin also entered the race for the Reform Party nomination. Hagelin had run for president in both 1992 and 1996 on the Natural Law Party ticket.

During his 2000 campaign, Hagelin appeared on ABC's Nightline (2000) and Politically Incorrect (2000), NBC's Meet the Press (2000), CNN's Larry King Live, PBS's News Hour with Jim Lehrer, Inside Politics,  CNBC's Hardball with Chris Matthews, and C-SPAN's Washington Journal.

In July it was announced that Hagelin and Buchanan would be the only two candidates on the primary ballot. Supporters of Hagelin later charged the results of the party's open primary, which favored Buchanan by a wide margin, were "tainted." Buchanan countered that Russ Verney had allowed the Hagelin campaign to mail a "Stop Buchanan" pamphlet using official "Reform Party" envelopes.

Much to the dismay of many Reform Party members, it became clear that the Hagelin campaign intended to merge the Natural Law Party, which was based on the teachings of Hindu guru Maharishi Mahesh Yogi with the secular Reform Party. On August 2, Buchanan's website posted a copy of a proposed resolution to merge the two parties.

The animosity between the two campaigns reached a breaking point at the party's convention in Long Beach, California. Buchanan supporters blocked Hagelin and his delegates from entering the convention. Hagelin's supporters declared the convention illegitimate, and announced their own rival convention nearby, where they endorsed John Hagelin as their presidential candidate.

With two individuals both claiming to be the Reform Party candidate, a court would have to determine who would be permitted to appear on the ballot and receive the $12.5 million in matching funds.

Results of the Mail-In Primary by State

Post-Convention
Ultimately, when the Federal Elections Commission ruled Buchanan was to receive ballot status as the Reform candidate, as well as about $12.6 million in federal campaign funds secured by Perot's showing in the 1996 election, Buchanan won the nomination. In his acceptance speech, Buchanan proposed U.S. withdrawal from the United Nations and expelling the U.N. from New York, abolishing the Internal Revenue Service, Department of Education, Department of Energy, Department of Housing and Urban Development, taxes on inheritance and capital gains, and affirmative action programs.

As his running mate, Buchanan chose African-American activist and retired teacher from Los Angeles, Ezola B. Foster. Buchanan was supported in this election run by future Socialist Party USA presidential candidate Brian Moore, who said in 2008 he supported Buchanan in 2000 because "he was for fair trade over free trade. He had some progressive positions that I thought would be helpful to the common man." On August 19, the New York Right to Life Party, in convention, chose Buchanan as their nominee, with 90% of the districts voting for him.

On November 2, party founder Ross Perot endorsed Republican George W. Bush for president.

The Reform Party never recovered from the 2000 fiasco. Many longtime members departed, the party's funds were depleted, and its reputation severely tarnished. On Election Day, Pat Buchanan only received 448,895 votes, thus losing the Reform Party's ballot access in most states. Buchanan returned to the Republican Party in 2001. During the 2004 election cycle, the Reform Party nominated Ralph Nader in hopes of relinquishing themselves of the "pro-life" label Buchanan had bestowed upon them. In 2008, Ted Weill, who had been a critic of Buchanan, was the party's presidential candidate. Donald Trump joined the Democratic Party in 2001, left in 2009 and remained an independent until 2012 when he returned to the Republican Party, seeking that party's nomination for president in the 2016 presidential election and became the 45th President of the United States.

Candidates

Declined to run

References

Reform Party of the United States of America presidential primaries
2000 United States presidential primaries